Claudio Morandini is an Italian writer.

Life 
He was born in Aosta in 1960. He is a highschool teacher.

In 2007, his short story Le dita fredde was published in the US by Black Arrow Press as part of the Santi – Lives of Modern Saints anthology.

He won the Premio Procida for his novel Neve, cane, piede, which has been translated into many languages, including an English edition by Peirene Press (2019). The novel's translator J Ockenden won the Peirene Stevns Translation Prize. In 2022 "Snow, dog, foot" is runner-up in the John Florio Prize.

Works 
 Nora e le ombre (Palomar 2006)
 Le larve (Pendragon, 2008)
 Rapsodia su un solo tema. Colloqui con Rafail Dvoinikov (Manni, 2010)
 Il sangue del tiranno (Agenzia X, 2011)
 A gran giornate (La Linea, 2012)
 Neve, cane, piede (Exòrma, 2015; Bompiani, 2021)
 Le pietre (Exòrma, 2017)
 Le maschere di Pocacosa (Salani, 2018)
 Gli oscillanti (Bompiani, 2019)
 Catalogo dei silenzi e delle attese (Bompiani, 2022)

English translations

References

Living people
21st-century Italian writers
21st-century Italian novelists
Italian male novelists
1960 births